Eleonora degli Albizzi (1543 – 19 March 1634) was a mistress of Cosimo I de' Medici, the Grand Duke of Tuscany. She had an illegitimate son with him, Don Giovanni de' Medici.

History
She was the daughter of an ancient Florentine family of moderate means, daughter of Luigi degli Albizzi and Nannina Soderini. With the consent of her father, by 1565, at the age of about 23–24 years, she became the mistress of the Granduke, who was a widower since the death of Eleonora of Toledo in 1562. In 1566, Albizzi had a daughter with the Duke. She soon died as an infant. In 1567 she had a son, Giovanni.

Rumors began to circulate that Cosimo wish to legitimize his union to Eleonora. Tradition holds that his long-time chamberlain Sforza Almeni of Perugia shared the Duke's desires with Francesco I, the legitimate heir who was increasingly the dominant force in the government. Francesco, likely worried about the entry of potential heirs and a mother-in-law, scolded his father about those plans. Thereupon, seized by rage because his secret desires had been revealed, on May 22, 1566, the Granduke is said to personally stabbed his chamberlain to death. This event, along with others episodes such as the rumored murder of Filippo Strozzi the Younger, reinforced a perception that Cosimo was possessed of an excessively passionate, if not bloodthirsty, ruthlessness.

The love affair between Cosimo and Eleonora quickly cooled, and by 1567 she was forced to marry the dishonored nobleman Carlo Panciatichi. Cosimo meanwhile latched on to an affair with another young woman, Camilla Martelli. Panchiato had faced execution for rebellion, and was herewith pardoned and granted a reward of 10 thousand scudi to take Eleonora. It is unclear what role his legitimate children played in arranging to remove Albizzi from the Grand Duke's orbit.

Eleonora had three children with Carlo, including Bartolomeo (born 1577). However, in 1578, she was accused of adultery and confined to the Monastery of Fuligno. She lived at the monastery for the last 56 years of her life.

References

1543 births
1634 deaths
Eleonora
16th-century Italian women
16th-century people of the Republic of Florence